Elisabeth S. Vrba (born 17 May 1942) is a paleontologist at Yale University who developed the turnover-pulse hypothesis.

Education 
Vrba earned her Ph.D. in Zoology and Palaeontology at the University of Cape Town, in 1974. Vrba studied zoology and mathematical statistics at the University of Cape Town to earn her undergraduate degree. She remained there for doctoral study in zoology and paleontology to earn her Ph.D. After receiving her doctorate, Vrba conducted her early research on African fossil records over the last several million years, tracking the sequence of fossils from analyzing the geological strata and analyzing the morphology of the fossils. She was the chief assistant to Charles Kimberlin Brain during his directorship of the Transvaal Museum.

Career 
She has been a faculty member at the Department of Geology & Geophysics, Yale University, since the early 1980s. She is well known for developing the turnover-pulse hypothesis, as well as coining the word exaptation with colleague Stephen Jay Gould. Her specific interest is in the Family Bovidae (antelopes, etc.), but her students are studying a wide range of species.

Innovations 
Vrba and colleague Stephen Jay Gould are renowned for their theory of exaptation. Stemming from Charles Darwin's research on genetic traits developed during adaptation in evolution, Vrba and Gould's research suggested that the historical origin of a genetic trait is not always reflective of its contemporary function. Genetic adaptations may take on new functions and may serve a species a different purpose further on in evolution. Gould died in 2002, but their theory has been widely referenced in recent years in popular science writing. Vrba and Gould's theory has also been criticized in recent years by scholars who assert that genetic traits are pressured by multiple factors, making it challenging to determine when adaptation or exaptation is at play.

Vrba also constructed the turnover-pulse hypothesis, a significant addition to macroevolutionary theory.

Selected publications
Gould, S. J. and E. S. Vrba. (1982).  "Exaptation—a missing term in the science of form." Paleobiology 8: 4-15.
Katherine Macinnes. "Evolving Vocabulary: the rise and fall of 'exaptation'" International Innovation, September 18, 2015, https://web.archive.org/web/20160825224345/http://www.internationalinnovation.com/evolving-vocabulary-the-rise-and-fall-of-exaptation/.
Lewis, R. "Surveying the Genomic Landscape of Modern Mammals," DNA Science Blog, January 29, 2015. http://blogs.plos.org/dnascience/2015/01/29/probing-genomic-landscape-modern-mammals/.
Michael Garfield. "Exaptation of the Guitar" Guitar International, September 17, 2010, https://web.archive.org/web/20130622042448/http://guitarinternational.com/2010/09/17/exaptation-of-the-guitar/.
Rozzi, Roberto. "Elisabeth Vrba | TrowelBlazers." trowelblazers.com. 2014. Accessed October 17, 2015. http://trowelblazers.com/elisabeth-vrba/.
Shapiro, J. "More Evidence on the Real Nature of Evolutionary DNA Change," Huffington Post, The Blog, June 1, 2012. http://www.huffingtonpost.com/james-a-shapiro/more-evidence-on-the-real_b_1158228.html. 
Shell, E. R. (1999). "Waves of Creation." Discover 14 (May): 54-61. 
Vrba, E. S. and Gould, S. J. (1986). "The hierarchical expansion of sorting and selection." Paleobiology. 12 (2): 217-228. 
Vrba, E. S. (1993). "The Pulse That Produced Us." Natural History 102 (5) 47-51.

References

1942 births
Living people
American paleontologists
Paleozoologists
Women paleontologists
American taxonomists
Women taxonomists
Yale University faculty
University of Cape Town alumni
20th-century American zoologists
21st-century American zoologists
20th-century American women scientists
21st-century American women scientists
American women academics